Aplocheilus is a genus of killifish in the family Aplocheilidae. Their native range is in South and Southeast Asia, from Pakistan to Vietnam and Malaysia, and from Nepal to Sri Lanka. Several species, especially the striped panchax, A. lineatus, are important aquarium fishes.

Etymology 
The name Aplocheilus is composed of the Greek words  meaning "simplicity", and  meaning "lip".

Species
The currently recognized species in this genus are:
 Aplocheilus andamanicus (Köhler, 1906)
 Aplocheilus armatus (van Hasselt, 1823)
 Aplocheilus blockii J. P. Arnold, 1911 (green panchax)
 Aplocheilus dayi Steindachner, 1892 (Ceylon killifish)
 Aplocheilus kirchmayeri Berkenkamp & Etzel, 1986
 Aplocheilus lineatus (Valenciennes, 1846) (striped panchax)
 Aplocheilus panchax (F. Hamilton, 1822) (blue panchax)
 Aplocheilus parvus (Sundara Raj, 1916) (dwarf panchax)
 Aplocheilus werneri Meinken, 1966 (Werner's killifish)

References

 
Aplocheilidae

Freshwater fish genera
Taxa named by John McClelland (doctor)